Unryul County is a county in South Hwanghae province, North Korea. The county is called by the name Eunyul in South Korea, due to the pronunciation differences between Northern and Southern Korean dialects.

History
Neolithic artefacts were found in the region then known as Gunryanggol village located in then subdivision called Changam-ri Nambumyeon(now forming part of Sandong-ri). Bronze age Dolmen were found in different parts of the County, and lot of bronze age artefacts along with Chinese kinfe money during the Han dynasty were found in the region in side the mud tombs.Different artefacts from the Iron age were also found in Unsŏng-ri. Archaeological findings related to the Lelang confederacy has also been found.During the kingdom of Goguryeo, it was called Yulgu or Yulcheon,In 757, when it was under the kingdom of Silla, the region was an associated region under the control of  Yangak County.After the founding of the Goryeo Kingdom, the region was known as the Unyul prefecture, which was divided into three regions (a subcounty that was under pungju,Jamgmyeongjin area under Hwangju,and the Yeonpungjang area which was owned by the Goryeo royals).In 1269, due to the control of Goryeo by the Yuan Dynasty, it was confisticated and was put under the control of Dongnyeong Prefectures but soon returned to the control of the kingdom of Goryeo in 1278.During the Joseon era, it went under the control of Pungchon county in 1414, but it soon returned as Unyul county.In 1919 it became a centre for mass protests.In 1954, it began to be a county under South Hwanghae Province.

Administrative divisions
Unryul county is divided into 1 ŭp (town), 1 rodongjagu (workers' district) and 21 ri (villages):

Transportation
Unryul county is served by the Ŭnnyul Line of the Korean State Railway.

Mining
The Unryul iron mine, located north of Unryul-ŭp, is one of North Korea's leading sources of iron ore. A  belt conveyor, built in 1975, carries waste rock from the mine to the coast. The rock has been used to build dikes between offshore islets and reclaim shallow bays for farming, fishing and salt evaporation.

See also
Kuwolsan
Kumsanpo
Kumsanpo peninsula
Unnyul talchum

References

Counties of South Hwanghae